The 2021–22 Süper Lig, officially called the Spor Toto Süper Lig Ahmet Çalık season, was the 64th season of the Süper Lig, the highest tier football league of Turkey.

Teams
A total of 20 teams contested the league, including 17 sides from the 2020–21 season and 2020–21 TFF First League champions Adana Demirspor, runner-ups Giresunspor and play-off winners Altay. Adana Demirspor returned top level after 26 years, Giresunspor returned after 44 years and Altay after 18 years. For the first time in 40 years, there was no team from the capital city, Ankara. 
The bottom four teams were relegated to the 2022–23 TFF First League.

Stadiums and locations

Personnel and sponsorship

Managerial changes

League table

Results

Number of teams by region

Statistics

Top scorers

Top assists

Clean sheets

Hat-tricks

5 Player scored five goals

Awards

Annual awards

References

External links

 

 

Turk
1
Süper Lig seasons